The United States recognized Azerbaijan's independence on December 25, 1991, and announced the establishment of diplomatic relations on February 19, 1992.  

The Baku embassy was opened by interim ambassador Robert Finn on March 16, 1992.

Chiefs of mission

Notes

See also
Azerbaijan - United States relations
Foreign relations of Azerbaijan
Ambassadors of the United States

References
United States Department of State: Background notes on Azerbaijan

External links
 United States Department of State: Chiefs of Mission for Azerbaijan
 United States Department of State: Azerbaijan
 United States Embassy in Baku

 
Azerbaijan
United States